Dhambit Mununggurr (born 1968) is an Yolngu artist known for unique ultramarine blue bark paintings inspired by natural landscapes and Yolngu stories and legends. Her father Mutitjpuy Mununggurr and mother Gulumbu Yunupingu were both celebrated Aboriginal artists, each having won first prizes at the Telstra National Aboriginal & Torress Strait Islander Awards (NATSIAA). After a vehicular accident in 2005, Mununggurr was severely injured, but returned to painting in 2010.

Biography 
Dhambit Mununggurr was born in 1968 to Mutitjpuy Mununggurr (1932-1993) and Gulumbu Yunupingu (1945–2012). Her father was the first artist to win the award with a bark painting (Djang'kawu) in 1990, and her mother won the award in 2004 for her work Garak, the Universe. Her father was one of the members of the Dhuwa moiety who contributed to the Yirrkala Church Panels (which would lead to the creation of the Yirrkala bark petitions of 1963), and served as a great inspiration for Mununggurr. In 2004, Mununggurr became the first Yolngu woman to graduate as a tour guide in Yirrkala.

In 2005, Mununggurr was hit by a truck, leaving her needing a wheelchair and unable to use her right hand to paint. Before the accident, she had begun painting in 2004, and was credited in the film Yolngu Boy (2000). Her recovery consisted of a Western treatment and traditional healing practices, and she entered an intensive rehabilitation program in 2011 at Epworth Rehabilitation in Melbourne, Victoria. When returning to painting in 2010, she trained herself to paint with her non-dominant left hand with her condition slowly improving. Her favouring of blue acrylics was an effect of the accident, with NATSIAA curators agreeing she could no longer grind traditional ochres used for bark painting with her limited dexterity in her right hand.

Her work was acquired by Artbank in 2018 in a collection which details Mununggurr's life and her familial ties. At the top, her maternal grandfather Mungurrawuy Yunupingu is pictured, and further down her uncles Galarrwuy and Mandawuy are shown. Her mother, Gulumbu Yunupingu, is represented through the stars which show what she had painted on the ceiling of the Musee du Quai Branly in Paris, France. Lastly, Dhambit herself is represented as a monolithic rock on Elcho Island.

Collections 
 Kluge-Ruhe Aboriginal Art Collection of the University of Virginia
 National Gallery of Victoria
 Artbank

Significant exhibitions 
 Mirdawarr Dhulan, Alcaston Gallery, Melbourne, Victoria, Australia (2011)
Mununggurr's first solo exhibition was named after her experience driving through remnants of burnt-out forest around King Lake with her partner Tony where she noticed green shoots sprouting from burned trees. The title refers to the "land after fire" and the "regrowth after fire."
 Gaybada - My Father was an Artist, Alcaston Gallery, Melbourne, Victoria, Australia (2015)
Mununggurr's second solo exhibition is inspired by her father Mutitjpuy Mununggurr. It features vibrant bark paintings in larrakitj (hollow poles), and credits her father as the driving force behind her art.

Provenance Does Matter - Living with Contemporary Art, Alcaston Gallery at Gallery 369, Bendigo, Victoria, Australia (2016)
This exhibition featured contemporary photography, video, paintings, ceramics, and sculptures. Other artists featured include Naomi Hobson, Nonggirrnga Marawili, Angela Tiatia, Judy Holding, Dean Smith, and Greg Semu.
Can We All Have A Happy Life, National Gallery of Victoria (NGV), Victoria, Australia (2019-2020)
This installation consisted of 15 bark paintings and nine larrakitj. NGV director Tony Ellwood commented on her work saying, "It's a story about coming out of adversity after a severe accident... It's profoundly beautiful."

References

Further reading 
 Nick Miller, "NGV Acquires the 'Wow' Factor, The Age (Melbourne Australia), 2020
 Quentin Sprague, "Blue is the colour: The idiosyncratic work of Yolngu artist Dhambit Mununggurr." The Monthly, December 2020.
 John McDonald, "It's Open Season in the South," The Sydney Morning Herald, 2021
 Museums and Art Galleries of the Northern Territory; Telstra, "The 35th Teslstra National Aboriginal and Torress Strait Islander Art Award, 12 August - 11 November 2018", Darwin Museum and Art Gallery of Northern Territory, 2018 
 Dhambit Mununggurr: Australian Art and Artists File, Australian Art and Artists File 
 Kerrie O'Brien and Craig Matheison, "Marvellous Melbourne," Sunday Age, 2020 
 "Triennial 2020: Can We All Have A Happy Life, Dhambit Mununggurr," The National Gallery of Victoria (NGV)

Australian Aboriginal artists
Yolngu people
1968 births
Living people